Chiqllarasu (Quechua, chiqlla green, Ancash Quechua rasu snow, ice, mountain with snow, Hispanicized spelling Chicllarazo) Portugueza or Portuguesa is a mountain in the Andes of Peru, about  high. It is situated in the Ayacucho Region, Cangallo Province,  Paras District. Chiqllarasu lies north-east of the mountain Saywa Q'asa, between the villages Patawasi (Patahuasi) in the northwest and Kichkawasi (Quichcahuasi) in the southeast.

Chiqllarasu lies on the top of the crest of the Western Cordillera. These are epithermal deposits with low sulfide content. The caldera was formed on a central volcano which erupted andesite and dacite. The Rio Apacheta and the Rio Quichcahuasi drain the edifice .

The Atunsulla tuff is formed by many flows of rhyolite which contain clasts and pumice. It advanced as much as  along the Rio Cachi, reaching the Ayacucho basin. The river has eroded deep into the tuff, which has been removed in many places by erosion.. This volcano may be underpinned by a large batholith..

Samples from the pre-Atunsulla tuff volcano have been dated at 4–3.5 million years ago . The Atunsulla tuff was erupted from Chiqllarasu around 2.4 million years ago . A long break in volcanic activity, during which the edifice was deeply eroded, may have occurred before this eruption. A resurgent dome formed 1.9 million years ago. Hydrothermal activity occurred both before and after the eruption of the Atunsulla tuff, and the mineralization occurred 1.9 million years ago, This volcano is among the youngest in a Central Peru volcanic chain ; hot water indicate that the geothermal system may be still active .

References

 
 
 
 

Volcanoes of Peru
Mountains of Ayacucho Region